is a private women's junior college in Osaka, Osaka Prefecture, Japan, established in 1965. The predecessor of the school was founded in 1935.

External links
 Official website

Educational institutions established in 1935
Private universities and colleges in Japan
Universities and colleges in Osaka
Women's universities and colleges in Japan
Japanese junior colleges
1935 establishments in Japan